Benicia Capitol State Historic Park is a state park in Benicia, California. The park is dedicated to California’s third capitol building, where the California State Legislature convened from February 3, 1853 to February 24, 1854, when they voted to move the state capital to Sacramento. It is the only pre-Sacramento capitol that remains. The park includes the Fischer-Hanlon House, an early Benicia building that was moved to the property and converted into a home in 1858, after the legislature departed. Benicia Capitol State Historic Park just off the city's main street also includes a carriage house, workers' quarters and sculptured gardens.

History
Following large complaints by state legislators of inadequate furniture and sleeping quarters in Vallejo, California in early 1853, the Legislature, with the consent of Governor John Bigler, relocated the state capital to nearby Benicia that same year. The Legislature would convene in the Benicia City Hall for a little more than a year, when again complaints over poor weather conditions, inadequate and uncomfortable sleeping quarters, and "the insecure condition of the public archives" arose in January 1854.

After a proposal by Sacramento to use the Sacramento County Courthouse free of charge as a capital building, the Assembly and Senate passed an enabling act, voiding all previous legislation, to move the state capital to its new location upriver in Sacramento. On February 25, 1854, Governor Bigler signed the act into law, moving the capital to its current location. The Legislature and governor climbed aboard the steamship Wilson G. Hunt to take up its new quarters. "So much opposed to the removal were the good people of Benicia," the Sacramento Union reported, "that the owners of the wharves, it is stated, refused to permit the steamer ... to land to take on the legislative furniture, unless she would pay $500." This request was refused and the furniture was shipped from a different wharf.

The Greek Revival-Palladian building was listed as a California State Historic Landmark on January 11, 1935. The National Register of Historic Places placed the Benicia capitol on the federal list on February 12, 1971.

Present day
The original building has been restored with reconstructed period furnishings and exhibits. The interior includes a reconstruction of the building's original floor with ponderosa pine. The desks, four of which are from the 1850s or earlier, are furnished with a candlestick, a 19th-century newspaper, a quill pen, blotting sand, a spitoon, and a top hat.

The historic park is located at 115 West G Street in Benicia, a city in the northern San Francisco Bay Area between San Pablo Bay and Suisun Bay.

On February 16, 2000, the California State Legislature met in the old Capitol in a symbolic session to celebrate the 150th anniversary of the Legislature's first meeting.

Proposed for closure
The Benicia Capitol State Historic Park was one of the 48 California state parks proposed for closure in January 2008 by California's Governor Arnold Schwarzenegger as part of a deficit reduction program, since rescinded following public outcry. It also was placed on the Governor's list of two hundred parks to close in fall of 2009 in response to the ongoing budget crisis and was on Jerry Brown's 2011 list of 70 proposed state park closures in the continuing budget crises.

In March 2013, then-Director of California Department of Parks and Recreation, Anthony L. Jackson, announced that no state parks would close during his tenure and that he had "done away with park closures."

Gallery

See also
List of California state parks
California State Legislature
John Bigler

References

External links

 Benicia Capitol State Historic Park official site
 Genealogy Society of Vallejo-Benicia
 California's State Capitols, 1850-present

1935 establishments in California
Benicia, California
California State Historic Parks
Former state capitols in the United States
Government buildings completed in 1852
Greek Revival architecture in California
History museums in California
History of Solano County, California
Legislative buildings
Government buildings on the National Register of Historic Places in California
Museums in Solano County, California
National Register of Historic Places in Solano County, California
Palladian Revival architecture in California
Parks in Solano County, California
Protected areas established in 1935